François Bourbotte (24 February 1913 – 15 December 1972) was a French professional footballer who played as a defender and midfielder. He made 17 appearances for the France national team between 1937 and 1942.

References

External links
 
 

1913 births
1972 deaths
Sportspeople from Pas-de-Calais
French footballers
France international footballers
Ligue 1 players
Lille OSC players
1938 FIFA World Cup players
French football managers
US Boulogne managers
Association football midfielders
Association football defenders
SC Fives players
Footballers from Hauts-de-France